Charles Milne may refer to:
 Charles Milne (politician)
 Charles Milne (rugby union)